In mathematics, a partial equivalence relation (often abbreviated as PER, in older literature also called restricted equivalence relation) is a homogeneous binary relation that is symmetric and transitive. If the relation is also reflexive, then the relation is an equivalence relation.

Definition 

Formally, a relation  on a set  is a PER if it holds for all  that:

 if , then  (symmetry)

The two definitions are seen to be equivalent by taking .

Properties and applications 

The following properties hold for a partial equivalence relation  on a set :

  is an equivalence relation on the subset .
 difunctional: the relation is the set  for two partial functions  and some indicator set 
 right and left Euclidean: For ,  and  implies  and similarly for left Euclideanness  and  imply 

None of these properties is sufficient to imply that the relation is a PER.

In non-set-theory settings

In type theory, constructive mathematics and their applications to computer science, constructing analogues of subsets is often problematic—in these contexts PERs are therefore more commonly used, particularly to define setoids, sometimes called partial setoids. Forming a partial setoid from a type and a PER is analogous to forming subsets and quotients in classical set-theoretic mathematics.

The algebraic notion of congruence can also be generalized to partial equivalences, yielding the notion of subcongruence, i.e. a homomorphic relation that is symmetric and transitive, but not necessarily reflexive.

Examples

A simple example of a PER that is not an equivalence relation is the empty relation , if  is not empty.

Kernels of partial functions
If  is a partial function on a set , then the relation  defined by 
is a partial equivalence relation, since it is clearly symmetric and transitive.

If  is undefined on some elements, then  is not an equivalence relation. It is not reflexive since if  is not defined then  — in fact, for such an  there is no  such that .

Functions respecting equivalence relations
Let X and Y be sets equipped with equivalence relations (or PERs) . For , define  to mean:

 

then  means that f induces a well-defined function of the quotients . Thus, the PER  captures both the idea of definedness on the quotients and of two functions inducing the same function on the quotient.

Equality of IEEE floating point values
The IEEE 754:2008 floating point standard defines an "EQ" relation for floating point values. This predicate is symmetrical and transitive, but is not reflexive because of the presence of NaN values that are not EQ to themselves.

Notes

References

Symmetric relations
Transitive relations
Equivalence (mathematics)